Iweta Rajlich (born Radziewicz, 16 March 1981) is a Polish chess International Master and Woman Grandmaster, multiple winner of Women Chess Championships of Poland.
She married Vasik Rajlich, the author of Rybka, on 19 August 2006. Iweta is the tester for the program. The couple presently live in Warsaw, Poland.

References

External links 

1981 births
Living people
Polish female chess players
Sportspeople from Warsaw
Chess International Masters
Chess woman grandmasters
World Youth Chess Champions